Mohammadabad (also Romanized as Moḩammadābād; also known as Mahdābad, Mohammad Abad Arzoo’eyeh, and Moḩammadābād-e Arzū’īyeh) is a village in Arzuiyeh Rural District, in the Central District of Arzuiyeh County, Kerman Province, Iran. At the 2006 census, its population was 745, in 156 families.

References 

Populated places in Arzuiyeh County